August Gawin was a member of the Wisconsin State Assembly.

Biography
Gawin was born on August 27, 1869, in Posen. He moved with his parents to Milwaukee, Wisconsin, on April 20, 1872. He was the founder of the Columbia Stained Glass Company. Gawin died in West Palm Beach, Florida, on December 8, 1945.

Career
Gawin was elected to the Assembly in 1896. He was a Democrat.

References

Politicians from Milwaukee
Businesspeople from Milwaukee
German emigrants to the United States
Democratic Party members of the Wisconsin State Assembly
1869 births
1945 deaths